Matuta is a genus of crabs in the family Matutidae, containing the following species:
 Matuta circulifera Miers, 1880
 Matuta inermis  Brocchi, 1883
 Matuta planipes Fabricius, 1798
 Matuta purnama Lai & Galil, 2007
 Matuta victor (Fabricius, 1781)

References

Calappoidea